James Buck (1808 – November 1, 1865) was an American Civil War Medal of Honor recipient and a sailor in the United States Navy.

Biography
Born in Baltimore, Maryland, Buck joined the Navy in 1852  as an Acting Master's Mate and he was awarded the Medal of Honor as a Quartermaster under General Order 11, dated April 3, 1863.

Buck is buried in Greenmount Cemetery in Baltimore.

Honors
The United States Navy named three ships after him — USS Buck. The first ship to be named after Buck,  was a motorboat built in 1911.

Medal of Honor citation
Rank and organization: Quartermaster, U.S. Navy. Born: 1808, Baltimore, Md. G.O. No.: 11, April 3, 1863.

Citation:

Served on board the U.S.S. Brooklyn in the attack upon Forts Jackson and St. Philip and at the taking of New Orleans, 24 and 25 April 1862. Although severely wounded by a heavy splinter, Buck continued to perform his duty until positively ordered below. Later stealing back to his post, he steered the ship for 8 hours despite his critical condition. His bravery was typical of the type which resulted in the taking of the Forts Jackson and St. Philip and in the capture of New Orleans.

See also

List of American Civil War Medal of Honor recipients: A–F

Notes

References

1808 births
1865 deaths
Union Navy officers
United States Navy Medal of Honor recipients
Military personnel from Baltimore
United States Navy sailors
People of Maryland in the American Civil War
American Civil War recipients of the Medal of Honor